David Myrestam (born 4 April 1987) is a Swedish former footballer who played as a defender.

References

External links
FKH profile

1987 births
Living people
Swedish footballers
Association football defenders
Umeå FC players
GIF Sundsvall players
FK Haugesund players
Allsvenskan players
Superettan players
Eliteserien players
Swedish expatriate footballers
Expatriate footballers in Norway
Swedish expatriate sportspeople in Norway